The Ruger SR1911 is a semi-automatic pistol modeled after the classic Colt M1911 pistol.

Design
Like the M1911, the Ruger 1911 is single action only. It also has features such as a beavertail grip safety and a manually operated thumb safety. In addition to these two safeties, the Ruger SR1911 also has a sear disconnect, slide stop and half-cock position. Although Colt's 80 series developed a trigger operated firing pin block safety, and Kimber and Smith & Wesson use a Swartz firing-pin safety, which is operated by the grip safety; the Ruger SR1911 pistol features a titanium firing pin and heavy firing pin spring, which negates the need for a firing pin block, offering an updated safety feature without compromising trigger pull weight.

To improve quality, the stainless steel barrel and bushings are all produced from the same bar stock and on the same machine. Features such as an oversized ejection port and an extended magazine release enhance the performance of the weapon as well. The SR1911 also has a visual inspection port which allows for visual confirmation that the chamber is loaded.

Design-wise, it is nearly identical to the M1911A1. After the gun is fired, the recoil energy sends the slide rearward slightly. At this point, a dropping link under the barrel pivots the barrel's rear down, out of locking lug recesses in the slide, and the barrel is stopped by making contact with the lower barrel lugs against the frame's vertical impact surface. As the slide continues rearward, a claw extractor pulls the spent casing from the firing chamber and an ejector strikes the rear of the case, pivoting it out and away from the pistol. The slide stops and is then propelled forward by a spring to strip a fresh cartridge from the magazine and feed it into the firing chamber. At the forward end of its travel, the slide locks into the barrel and is ready to fire again.

Variants
 SR1911: features a full length 8.67" slide with a 5" barrel, a standard magazine capacity of 8+1 and a weight of 39 oz. Constructed from low-glare stainless steel.
 SR1911 Commander (SR1911CMD): has a shorter overall length of 7.75", shorter barrel length of 4.25", reduced magazine capacity of 7+1, and lighter unloaded weight of 36.40 oz. Also constructed from low-glare stainless steel.
 SR1911 Lightweight Commander (SR1911LWCMD): Same overall length of 7.75", shorter barrel length of 4.25", same magazine capacity of 7+1, and an even lighter unloaded weight of 29.3 oz, thanks to its frame being constructed from lightweight anodized aluminum, rather than stainless steel. This also makes the Lightweight Commander a two-tone pistol.
 SR1911 Officer (SR1911LWOfficer) comes with 3.6" barrel and is chambered in 9mm.

References

1911 platform
.45 ACP semi-automatic pistols
9mm Parabellum semi-automatic pistols
SR1911
Semi-automatic pistols of the United States
Weapons and ammunition introduced in 2011